Giuseppe Spagnoli (1 February 1947 – 14 February 2003) was an Italian wrestler who won a bronze medal at the 1975 Mediterranean Games.

He also competed in the men's freestyle 74 kg at the 1976 Summer Olympics.

Biography
On Saturday 21 November 2009 the Italian National Olympic Committee (Liguria section) celebrated the Ligurian athletes participating in the Montreal 1976, Moscow 1980 and Los Angeles 1984 Olympics, including Spagnoli who had died six years before that event.

Achievements

National titles
Spagnoli has won three national championships.

Italian Wrestling Championships
70 kg: 1968
74 kg: 1971, 1974

References

External links
 

1947 births
2003 deaths
Italian male sport wrestlers
Olympic wrestlers of Italy
Wrestlers at the 1976 Summer Olympics
Sportspeople from Genoa
Mediterranean Games bronze medalists for Italy
Competitors at the 1975 Mediterranean Games
20th-century Italian people